Lehto is a Finnish surname. Notable people with the surname include:

 Arlene Ione Lehto, American politician and businesswoman
 JJ Lehto, Finnish racing car driver
 Joni Lehto, Finnish ice hockey player
 Katja Lehto, Finnish ice hockey player
 Leevi Lehto, Finnish poet, translator, and programmer
 Olli Lehto, Finnish mathematician
 Pekka Lehto, Finnish film director
 Petteri Lehto, Finnish ice hockey player
 Rami Lehto, Finnish politician
 Reino Ragnar Lehto, Finnish politician
 Seppo Lehto, Finnish activist

Finnish-language surnames